Honorat de Porchères Laugier (8 June 1572 – 26 October 1653) was a French poet. He was born in Forcalquier. He is most notable for his sonnet on the beautiful eyes of Gabrielle d'Estrées and for being a founder member of the Académie française. He is sometimes called Honoré de Porchères Laugier.

References

External links
 
Académie française

1572 births
1653 deaths
People from Alpes-de-Haute-Provence
French poets
16th-century French writers
16th-century male writers
17th-century French writers
17th-century French male writers
Members of the Académie Française
French male poets